Solduz Rural District is in the Central District of Naqadeh County, West Azerbaijan province, Iran. At the National Census of 2006, its population was 8,282 in 1,759 households. There were 8,742 inhabitants in 2,396 households at the following census of 2011. At the most recent census of 2016, the population of the rural district was 9,182 in 2,585 households. The largest of its 37 villages was Chianeh, with 3,878 people.

References 

Naqadeh County

Rural Districts of West Azerbaijan Province

Populated places in West Azerbaijan Province

Populated places in Naqadeh County